The 2021 season is the 131st competitive association football season in New Zealand.

National teams

New Zealand men's national football team

Results and fixtures

Unofficial

Friendlies

New Zealand women's national football team

Results and fixtures

Friendlies

2020 Summer Olympics

Group G

New Zealand national under-23 football team

Results and fixtures

Friendlies

2020 Summer Olympics

Group B

Knockout

Men's football

National League: South Central Series

Grand final

Northern League

Melville won 1–0, but West Coast fielded an ineligible player. Result upgraded to a 3–0 win for Melville.
North Shore won 2–0, but West Coast fielded an ineligible player. Result upgraded to a 3–0 win for North Shore.
League completed early with games still in hand due to Covid-19 and Auckland being in Level 4.

Central League

Southern League

Cup Competitions

Chatham Cup

Final

Women's football

National Women's League: South Central Series

NRFL Women's Premier League

League completed early with two rounds remaining due to Covid-19 and Auckland being in Level 4.
There was no relegation with the league expanding to eight teams instead for 2022.

Cup Competitions

Kate Sheppard Cup

Final

New clubs
Northern Rovers
South City Royals
West Coast Rangers

Clubs removed
Hawke's Bay United
Team Wellington
Waitakere United

Notes

References

2020–21 in New Zealand association football 
2021 sport-related lists